Victory Parts is the second album by Scottish indie rock band AC Acoustics. The album was widely acclaimed in the music press and displays an evolution of the band's sound from The Jesus and Mary Chain-derived noiseniks to wall-of-sound rock.

Track listing
 Hand Passes Empty  
 Stunt Girl  
 Ex Quartermaster  
 Admirals All  
 Hammerhead  
 Kill Zane  
 Fast  
 Continuity Freak  
 High Divers  
 Absent Luck Liner  
 I Messiah Am Jailer  
 Can't See Anything (Red Not Yellow)

References 
 O'Reilly, John. "This week's pop CD releases", The Guardian, 1997-07-11, p. T16.
 Luffman, Mark (1997-05-31). "Victory Parts", Melody Maker, 74 (22): 49.

1997 albums
AC Acoustics albums

sv:Barbed Wire Kisses